Actinopsis may refer to:
 Actinopsis (cnidarian), a genus of cnidarians in the family Actiniidae
 Actinopsis, a genus of funguses in the family Porinaceae, synonym of Trichothelium
 Actinopsis, a fossil genus of echinoderms in the family Phymosomatidae, synonym of Diplotagma